The Pit is an original novel written by Neil Penswick and based on the long-running British science fiction television series Doctor Who. It features the Seventh Doctor and Bernice. A prelude to the novel, also penned by Penswick, appeared in Doctor Who Magazine #197.

Synopsis
In an attempt to lighten the Doctor's mood, his companion Bernice suggests an investigation of a planetary system of seven planets that had seemingly vanished. The TARDIS materializes on the worst of the seven and the two are assailed by multiple types of threats. The Doctor is thrown into another universe entirely. Bernice soon realizes the source of the dangers come from the Doctor's own past.

External links
The Pit Prelude
The Cloister Library – The Pit

1993 British novels
1993 science fiction novels
Virgin New Adventures
Seventh Doctor novels
Works about William Blake